The 2016 Asian Wrestling Championships was held at the Bangkok Youth Center in Bangkok, Thailand. The event took place from February 17 to February 21, 2016.

Medal table

Team ranking

Medal summary

Men's freestyle

Men's Greco-Roman

Women's freestyle

Participating nations 
285 competitors from 25 nations competed.

 (2)
 (23)
 (10)
 (24)
 (16)
 (7)
 (24)
 (1)
 (24)
 (17)
 (16)
 (8)
 (4)
 (1)
 (3)
 (2)
 (4)
 (22)
 (6)
 (9)
 (11)
 (13)
 (1)
 (24)
 (13)

References

Results Book

External links
UWW Official website

Asia
Asian Wrestling Championships
Wrestling Championships
Wrestling Championships
International wrestling competitions hosted by Thailand